Zahna is a town and a former municipality in Wittenberg district in Saxony-Anhalt, Germany not far from Federal Highway (Bundesstraße) B 2 and about 11 km east of Lutherstadt Wittenberg. It was the seat of the former administrative community (Verwaltungsgemeinschaft) of Elbaue-Fläming. Since 1 January 2011, it is part of the town Zahna-Elster.

History
Zahna is one of Saxony-Anhalt's oldest towns. It has been proved that Zahna has been inhabited uninterruptedly since about 2000 BC. This has been established by archaeological findings from the 6th century BC up until the migration of the Semnoni who settled in the region.

After them came the Sorbs who took over their homes. The historic town core shows the form and structure that goes back to Flemish settlement in the High Middle Ages in the twelfth century.

The whole highland north of Wittenberg was so strongly shaped by the Flemings' ways of doing things that the whole area came to be named after them; to this day, it is still called the Fläming and the town belongs to the Fläming Nature Park, which was opened in 2005.

Town partnerships
  Stęszew near Poznań, Poland.
  Edemissen near Peine, Germany.

References

External links

 Information about Zahna

Towns in Saxony-Anhalt
Former municipalities in Saxony-Anhalt
Zahna-Elster
Fläming Heath